WASP-69 is a K-type main-sequence star. Its surface temperature is 4782 K. WASP-69 is slightly enriched in heavy elements compared to the Sun, with a metallicity Fe/H index of 0.10, and is much younger than the Sun at 2 billion years. The data regarding starspot activity of WASP-69 are inconclusive, but spot coverage of the photosphere may be very high.

Multiplicity surveys did not detect any stellar companions to WASP-69 as of 2020.

Planetary system
In 2013, one planet, named WASP-69b, was discovered on a tight, circular orbit.

The planetary atmosphere is extremely hazy and contains a partial cloud deck with cloud tops rising to a pressure of 100 Pa. Its composition is mostly hydrogen and helium, and sodium was also detected in low concentration. The sodium may originate from volcanic moons, not from the planet itself.

By 2021, the presence of hazes in atmosphere of WASP-69b was confirmed, along with the solar or super-solar water abundance.

In August 2022, this planetary system was included among 20 systems to be named by the third NameExoWorlds project.

References

Aquarius (constellation)
Planetary transit variables
K-type main-sequence stars
Planetary systems with one confirmed planet
J21000618-0505398
-05 5432